The following is the final results of the Iranian Volleyball Super League (The Promised Cup) 2005/06 season.

Standings

 Persepolis relegated as the worst team from Tehran.

Results

* Forfeit

References 
 volleyball.ir 

League 2005-06
Iran Super League, 2005-06
Iran Super League, 2005-06
Volleyball League, 2005-06
Volleyball League, 2005-06